The Eduardo Mondlane University (UEM) is the oldest and largest university in Mozambique. The UEM is located in Maputo and has about 40,000 students enrolled.

History

The institution was set up as a center for higher education in 1962 in what was then Lourenço Marques, the capital of Portugal's overseas province of Mozambique. Founded by the time of Overseas Minister Adriano Moreira, it was called Estudos Gerais Universitários de Moçambique (Mozambique General University Studies) after Studium Generale; in 1968 it became the Universidade de Lourenço Marques (University of Lourenço Marques).  After Mozambique became independent in 1975, the city was renamed "Maputo" and the university was renamed in honor of Frelimo leader Eduardo Mondlane in 1976.

Student enrolment
All students at the Universidade Eduardo Mondlane are full-time, contact students. As of 2015, the university consists of around 40,000 students, of which around 3,300 are pursuing postgraduate courses

Notable alumni

 Nazira Abdula, Mozambican Minister of Health
 Mari Alkatiri, The first Prime Minister of Timor Leste
 U. Aswathanarayana, Honorary Director of the Mahadevan International Centre for Water Resources Management, India
 Alice Banze, is a trained social scientist active with Oxfam
 Mia Couto, Mozambican author, poet, journalist, and biologist

See also
Education in Mozambique

References

External links
 
Enrollment Data
Southern African Regional Universities Association

 
Education in Maputo
Forestry education
Educational institutions established in 1962
1962 establishments in Mozambique
Association of African Universities
Universities in Mozambique